Proof of Life is a 2000 American kidnap thriller film.

Proof of Life may also refer to:

 Proof of life, a phrase referring to evidence used to indicate proof that a kidnap victim is still alive
 Proof of Life (The Bill), a 2008 crossover TV episode between SOKO Leipzig and The Bill
Proof of Life (album), 2013 studio album by Scott Stapp
 Proof of Life, 2007 studio album by Cesium_137
"Proof of Life" (Scott Stapp song), 2015 single with the eponymous 2013 song off the eponymous 2013 album
"Proof of Life", a song by Brian Fallon from his 2018 album Sleepwalkers
Proof of Life (tours), two concert tours in 2014 and 2016, by Scott Stapp

See also

 Evidence of extraterrestrial life
 
 
 Proof (disambiguation)
 Life (disambiguation)